The 2022 Besta deild karla was the 111th season of top-flight Icelandic football. Twelve teams contested the league, including the defending champions Víkingur Reykjavík, who won their sixth league title in 2021. It was the first season of the league after it was rebranded as Besta deild karla.

Teams

The 2022 Besta deild karla is contested by twelve teams, ten of which played in the division the previous year and two teams promoted from 1. deild karla. The bottom two teams from the previous season, HK and Fylkir (both relegated after one year in the top flight), were relegated to the 2022 1. deild karla and were replaced by Knattspyrnufélagið Fram (promoted after a seven-year absence) and ÍBV (promoted after a two-year absence), champions and runners-up of the 2020 1. deild karla respectively.

Club information

League table

Fixtures and results
Each team was originally scheduled to play home and away once against every other team for a total of 22 games each.

Championship round

Relegation round

Top scorers

Notes

References

External links
  

Úrvalsdeild karla (football) seasons
1
Iceland
Iceland